"Family Tree"  is a song by American rock band Kings of Leon. The song was released as a digital download on June 17, 2014 through RCA Records as the sixth and final single from their sixth studio album Mechanical Bull (2013). The song was written by Caleb Followill, Nathan Followill, Jared Followill and Matthew Followill.

Track listing

Personnel
 Caleb Followill - lead vocals, rhythm guitar
 Nathan Followill - drums, backing vocals
 Matthew Followill - lead guitar
 Jared Followill - bass
 Angelo Petraglia - electric Wurlitzer piano, backing vocals

Chart performance

Weekly charts

References

2013 songs
2014 singles
Kings of Leon songs
RCA Records singles
Songs written by Caleb Followill
Songs written by Jared Followill
Songs written by Matthew Followill
Songs written by Nathan Followill